Hozuki's Coolheadedness is a supernatural dark comedy Japanese animated series based on the 2011 manga series written and illustrated by Natsumi Eguchi. The story follows the title character, Hozuki, a demon ogre who works for the god of death, King Enma, as a supervisor in the Japanese Hell. The series is episodic, and in each episode the serious-minded Hozuki attempts to manage and troubleshoot unusual problems which occur there.

A thirteen-episode first season was produced by Wit Studio and directed by Hiro Kaburaki, with screenplay by Midori Gotō and characters design by Hirotaka Katō. It was broadcast on Mainichi Broadcasting System between January 10, 2014, and April 4, 2014. It was later aired on television networks TBS, CBC, BS-TBS, TVK and AT-X, and streamed on Bandai Channel, Video Market, Docomo Anime Store, Niconico and ShowTime. The entire season was released by King Records from April 9 to August 13, 2014, on DVD and Blu-ray. Crunchyroll simulcasted the season with English subtitles in the United States, Canada, the United Kingdom, South Africa, Australia and New Zealand. Sentai Filmworks licensed the season for home media release in North America, and Madman Entertainment did the same for the Australian region.

A second season was produced by Studio Deen with a new director, Kazuhiro Yoneda, and character designer, Jirō Omatsuri, but with the same writer, Midori Gotō. It was broadcast on Tokyo MX between October 8, 2017, and July 1, 2018. It also aired on television networks Sun Television, BS11, KBS and AT-X, and streamed on AbemaTV, Amazon Prime Video, Hulu, Rakuten TV, U-Next, Softbank Anime, Flat Dōga, Anime Store, Docomo Anime Store, Niconico, Bandai Channel, Video Market and Gyao. Sentai Filmworks licensed the season for home media and digital release in North America. Sentai's website Hidive simulcasted the season with English subtitles in the United States, Canada, the United Kingdom, Ireland, South Africa, Australia and New Zealand.

The series uses eight pieces of theme music: three opening themes and five ending themes. The second half of the second season had the opening theme  by Jigoku no Sata All Stars, and the ending theme  by Uesaka.

Episode list

2014 season

2017–2018 season

Original animation DVDs
In June 2014, a series of three original anime DVDs (OADs) was announced to be produced by the same staff of the anime series. The OADs were screened in eleven selected theaters in Japan from December 6 to December 28, 2014. They were released along with the 17th, 18th, and 19th manga volumes on February 23, May 22, and August 21, 2015, respectively. A fourth OAD was released through the 24th volume on March 21, 2017. Three more OADs were produced by the same staff of the second season, with production by Pine Jam. The first two were released along with the 29th and 30th manga volumes on September 20, 2019, and March 23, 2020; and the third was released along with the 31st volume on September 23, 2020.

Home media

2014 season
King Records released the complete Hozuki's Coolheadednesss first season in Japan on six Blu-ray and DVD volumes between April 9 and August 13, 2014. Each one of the six compilations has an "A" and "B" version that includes different covers and package. For Region 1, Sentai Filmworks has licensed the series and released the complete series with English subtitles in a single box on DVD and Blu-ray on February 17, 2015. Madman Entertainment released a DVD box on October 21, 2015, in Australia and New Zealand.

2017–2018 season
King Records settled to release the second season on two Blu-Ray and DVD boxes between January 17 and March 14, 2018. Sentai Filmworks has licensed the season for Region 1.

Notes

References

Lists of anime episodes